is a Japanese professional golfer.

Inoue played on the Japan Golf Tour, winning twice.

Professional wins (3)

Japan Golf Tour wins (2)

Other wins (1)
1980 Toyama Open

Team appearances
World Cup (representing Japan): 1979

External links

Kouichi Inoue at the PGA of Japan official website (in Japanese)

Japanese male golfers
Japan Golf Tour golfers
1946 births
Living people